Joseph Richards (1868 – death unknown) was an English rugby union footballer who played in the 1890s. He played at representative level for England, and at club level for Bradford FC, as a forward, e.g. front row, lock, or back row. Prior to Tuesday 27 August 1895, Bradford FC was a rugby union club, it then became a rugby league club, and since 1907 it has been the association football (soccer) club Bradford Park Avenue.

Background
Joseph Richards was born in Bedworth, Warwickshire.

Playing career

International honours
Joseph Richards won caps for England while at Bradford FC in 1891 against Wales, Ireland, and Scotland.

Change of Code
When Bradford FC converted from the rugby union code to the rugby league code on Tuesday 27 August 1895, Joseph Richards would have been in his twenties. Consequently, he may have been both a rugby union and rugby league footballer for Bradford FC.

References

External links
Search for "Richards" at rugbyleagueproject.org
Search for "Joseph Richards" at britishnewspaperarchive.co.uk

1868 births
Bradford F.C. players
England international rugby union players
English rugby union players
Rugby union forwards
Rugby union players from Warwickshire
Year of death missing